Rachele Sangiuliano (born 23 June 1981 in San Donà di Piave) is a retired female volleyball player who represented Italy in the early 2000s. She was a member of the Women's National Team that won the gold medal at the 2002 World Championship in Germany.

1981 births
Living people
Italian women's volleyball players
Sportspeople from the Metropolitan City of Venice
People from San Donà di Piave